Ben Steel  is an Australian actor and director who is most known for his regular role of Jude Lawson in Australian soap Home and Away.

Early life and acting training

Steel's parents are Glenys Steel and Ray Steel. He has two older sisters, Nicole Simpson (Steel) and Kara Joiner (Steel).
Steel moved to Sydney after completing his high school studies in 1993. His family remained in Melbourne.

Steel started taking acting lessons when he was eleven. This later led to studies at Sydney's Australian Theatre for Young People and The Actor's Centre. It was at The Actor's Pulse in Sydney that Steel discovered the Meisner acting technique.

He continued his studies with the Meisner technique overseas at The Impulse Company in London, and Playhouse West in Los Angeles.

He is currently studying at The Prague Playhouse in the Czech Republic.

Early career

Steel began appearing in television commercials at the age of eleven.

He made his first appearance on a television drama series in 1992 when, as a seventeen-year-old, he appeared in the award-winning crime series Phoenix on Australia's ABC-TV.

At the age of fifteen he purchased his first video camera to explore life on the other side of the lens.

Steel studied media and film studies at high school then moved to Sydney to pursue full-time work in the film industry. Steel's tenacity paid off when he scored a lighting job on the high-rating ABC program Heartbreak High. This was the break Steel needed, giving him enough technical experience to work behind-the-scenes on bigger projects such as the feature films Doing Time for Patsy Cline, Dark City and Oscar and Lucinda.

Taking a side step in the position of Production Runner enabled Steel to absorb new skills at very close range to master filmmakers.  The position offered an insight into everything from pre to post production, as he worked on IMAX: The Story of a City with Bruce Beresford; First Daughter; Bootmen with Dein Perry;  Babe: Pig in the City with George Miller; The Matrix with the Wachowskis; and finally hit the jackpot with Moulin Rouge! and director Baz Luhrmann.

Home and away

Steel returned to appearing in front of the camera and into the spotlight. On 30 October 2000, Steel made his first appearance as Jude Lawson in the high-rating nightly Australian soap Home and Away. He played the popular character for three seasons and appeared in more than 160 episodes.

Short films

In addition to his acting commitments on Home and Away, Steel continued to develop several feature film projects while refining his directing skills on short films.  He has since completed more than twenty short films including Airhead starring Andrew Hill and Mum's the Word starring Chris Egan, both winners of best comedy at "The Shootout 24hour Filmmaking Festival".

In 2002 he took his filmmaking to new extremes, when he rose to the challenge to make Diagnosis Narcolepsy, a 16mm, 7-minute film, starring Scott Major, Erik Thomson, Salvatore Coco, Lara Cox, Jeremy Kewley and Deni Hines, and the film was completed in just 24 hours.

UK career

After finishing Home and Away Steel went to the UK to play Prince Valentine in the pantomime Snow White. Steel subsequently starred in his first independent feature film The Bitten Tongue, where he had fun playing a cross-dressing, money laundering gangster. His next project was another bad guy abducting David Beckham's hairdresser in Unfashionable Tramps followed by a successful season at the Edinburgh Festival Fringe starring in This is Soap and presenting two music festivals for Five.  Then Steel went to the US and spent a few months studying acting at Playhouse West under the eye of founders Jeff Goldblum and Robert Carnegie.

Return to Australia
He returned home in 2004 to star in the cult theatrical production of Debbie Does Dallas: The Musical to a sold-out season.

He then went behind the camera again in his music video directorial debut by making "Shower the People" for Australian singing legend Marcia Hines and Belinda Emmett.

He then flew to New Zealand to direct the short film Pullin Roots starring Beau Brady and Clayton Watson.

Back to Europe

2005 saw Steel depart to the UK to revive his character of Prince Valentine in the pantomime Snow White, it also marked the year that Steel made his West End Theatre debut. Steel headed up the cast of The Vegemite Tales, an Australian play that is set in a share-house in London. The play ran for 12 weeks to sellout audiences. Next Steel continued performing in theatre in Serial Killers, a New Zealand play written by James Griffen performed at the Darby Playhouse.

2006 brought Steel back to Australia where he worked with director Spike Jonze on the movie Where the Wild Things Are.

Czech Republic

2007 and Steel moved to Prague the capital of the Czech Republic.

However, in August 2007 Steel briefly flew back to Australia for a supporting role in the indie feature film Four of a Kind a/k/a Disclosure directed by Fiona Cockrane.

Returning to the Czech Republic, he was cast in the role of Fletcher in the much anticipated Solomon Kane with James Purefoy. The 2008 film was set in the late 16th Century during Puritan times and was based on the classic novel written by Robert E Howard. The film was entirely shot in Prague during the middle of winter.

Steel scored his next big screen role in 2009 when he was cast in Red Tails, which was produced by George Lucas and stars Cuba Gooding Jr and Terrence Howard and was released in 2012.

Aruba

In mid-2009, Steel was commissioned by national Aruban Broadcaster ATV (Aruba) to produce and direct the television program Stars of Tomorrow. The program was a reality drama series that follows the life of aspiring young actors living in Aruba.

Filmography

Acting

Directing

Personal life

Relationships
Steel met Deni Hines on the set of the Seven Network Perth Telethon in 2001. Hine's sang her then current single "Frenzy" while sitting on the knee of Steel. The couple were reported as dating several months later, and were seen travelling to many destinations around the world. Their engagement was announced in the social pages of Australian newspapers in 2003. The reason for their 2004 break-up has never been made public, though the rumours say she broke up with him leaving him severely heart broken.

Charitable work

Steel attended Good Friday Appeal 2001–2002. The Good Friday Appeal is a fundraising activity that brings together people from all parts of the community in a very special way. The common goal is to raise money for The Royal Children's Hospital, in Melbourne, and to ensure that all children with life-threatening illnesses receive the best possible medical and clinical care.

Awards nominations
Logie Award:
Best New Talent nomination Home and Away (2001)

References

External links

 The Actor's Pulse
 Prague Playhouse
 Home and Away video
 Debbie Does Dallas: the musical
Celebrity Appearance
Shootout Celebrity Challenge 2002
Link to: AU Soaps profile

1975 births
Australian male film actors
Australian male television actors
Living people
Male actors from Melbourne